Peter Miller (born 1968) is a Canadian actor.

His credits have included the television series MVP, Virginie and Lance et Compte, and the films  Mambo Italiano and Rouge sang. Miller portrayed Galeazzo Maria Sforza in the 2009 short-film series Assassin's Creed: Lineage.

Miller graduated from the Neighborhood Playhouse in Manhattan, New York City. He was born in Chibougamau, Quebec and spent part of his childhood in the Bahamas. His mother is of French descent and his father is of Irish descent. He is anglophone-francophone bilingual.

He is also a former professional football player in the Canadian Football League. He was drafted in the seventh round of the 1992 CFL draft by the Saskatchewan Roughriders and played six seasons in the CFL with the Roughriders, BC Lions, and Toronto Argonauts as a linebacker; he played college football for Pacific.

Filmography

Film

Series

See also 
 Hero and the Terror (1988 film)

References

External links 
 

1969 births
Living people
Male actors from Quebec
Anglophone Quebec people
Canadian male film actors
Canadian people of Irish descent
Canadian male television actors
Francophone Quebec people
People from Chibougamau
Quebecers of French descent